The Russia men's national under-23 volleyball team represents Russia in international men's volleyball competitions and friendly matches under the age 23 and it is ruled by the Russian Volleyball Federation That is an affiliate of International Volleyball Federation FIVB and also a part of European Volleyball Confederation CEV.

In response to the 2022 Russian invasion of Ukraine, the International Volleyball Federation suspended all Russian national teams, clubs, and officials, as well as beach and snow volleyball athletes, from all events. The European Volleyball Confederation (CEV) also banned all Russian national teams, clubs, and officials from participating in European competition, and suspended all members of Russia from their respective functions in CEV organs.

Results

FIVB U23 World Championship
 Champions   Runners up   Third place   Fourth place

Team

Current squad

The following is the Russian roster in the 2017 FIVB Men's U23 World Championship.

Head coach: Andrey Voronkov

References

External links
 Official website 

National men's under-23 volleyball teams
Russia national volleyball team
Volleyball in Russia